Joseph Fahnbulleh (born 11 September 2001) is a Liberian-American sprinter. An Olympic finalist, Fahnbulleh is a double NCAA champion and finished fourth at the 2022 World Athletics Championships in the 200 meters race.

Early and personal life
Born in Hopkins, Minnesota, to Liberian parents, Fahnbulleh attended Hopkins High School.

Career
After being named National High School Coaches' Association boys athlete of the year in 2019 he was encouraged by Florida coach Mike Holloway to attend the University of Florida, and Fahnbulleh subsequently won the 200 m at the 2021 NCAA Outdoor National Championships with a personal best time of 19.91 seconds. He was also named National Senior Boys' Track and Field Athlete of the Year.

After declaring for Liberia and being named in their team for the 2020 Summer Olympics in Tokyo, Fahnbulleh was given the honor of being the flag bearer for his nation in the opening ceremony. The journey to Tokyo for the Olympics was the first time Fahnbulleh had ever been outside of the United States.

He made it through to the final of the 2020 Olympics 200 meters race with a time of 19.99 seconds in his semi-final, setting a new Liberian national record. He finished in fifth place in the final, again setting a new national record with a time of 19.98 seconds.

On 10 June 2022, Fahnbulleh won both the 100 m and 200 m events at the 2022 NCAA Division I Outdoor Track and Field Championships with times of 10.00 (+0.6 m/s) and 19.83 (+0.6m/s) respectively, helping the Florida Gators to the 2022 NCAA men's team title.

Fahnbulleh placed fourth at the 2022 World Athletics Championships in the 200 metres running 19.84 seconds in the final.

In August 2022, Fahnbulleh announced he had signed a professional contract with global brand Asics.

Statistics
Information from World Athletics profile unless otherwise noted.

Personal records

References

External links
 

2001 births
Living people
Liberian male sprinters
American male sprinters
Athletes (track and field) at the 2020 Summer Olympics
Florida Gators men's track and field athletes
Olympic athletes of Liberia
Track and field athletes from Minnesota
People from Hopkins, Minnesota
American people of Liberian descent
Hopkins High School alumni